Man in the Music: The Creative Life and Work of Michael Jackson is a non-fiction book written by Joseph Vogel, published in June 2011 by the Sterling Publishing.

Reception
Man in the Music: The Creative Life and Work of Michael Jackson, was described by the Associated Press as "a fascinating read and really a must have for any fan of Jackson." Filmmaker Spike Lee characterized it as having "brilliantly cracked the DNA, the code, the artistry of Michael Joseph Jackson."

References

Works about Michael Jackson
2011 non-fiction books
Sterling Publishing books